Cellar door may refer to:

 Cellar door (phrase), commonly cited in popular culture as a beautiful-sounding English phrase 
 Cellar door (wine), sales room at a winery
 Cellar Door: Terminus ut Exordium, 2014 release by The Underachievers
 Cellar Door (John Vanderslice album), 2004 release by John Vanderslice
 The Cellar Door, music club in Washington DC 1964–81
 The Cellar Door Sessions 1970, 2005 release of 1970 Miles Davis sessions at the club
 Live at The Cellar Door, 1975 album by The Seldom Scene 
 Live at the Cellar Door, 2013 album by Neil Young, recorded in 1970

See also

 
 Cellar (disambiguation)
 Door (disambiguation)